Lederle may refer to:
 2444 Lederle, asteroid
 Lederle Laboratories, acquired by Wyeth which was acquired by Pfizer
 John W. Lederle, academic and former president of the University of Massachusetts Amherst
 Lederle Tower, a research facility named after John Lederle, located in Amherst, Massachusetts
 Arthur F. Lederle (1887–1972)
 Neville Lederle (1938–2019)
 Franz Xaver Lederle (born 1931), German cinematographer